The 2021 season is Tampines Rovers's 26th season at the top level of Singapore football and 76th year in existence as a football club. The club will also compete in the Singapore League Cup, the Singapore Cup, and the AFC Champions League. The season covers from 13 March 2021 to 11 September 2021.

Squad

Singapore Premier League

U21

Coaching staff

Transfers

In 

Pre-season

Mid-season

Loan Return 

Pre-season

Note 1: Nurshafiq Zaini returned to Young Lions on loan for another season.

Note 2: Haikal Hasnol returned to the club after NS before being released.

Mid-season

Nurshafiq Zaini returned and retired with immediate effect.

Out
Pre-season

Note 1: Syahrul Sazali & Joel Chew subsequently moved to Young Lions for the 2021 season on loan.

Loan Out

Extension and retained

Mid-Season

Friendlies

Pre-season

In-season

Team statistics

Appearances and goals
 21 September 2021

Competitions

Overview

Charity Shield

Singapore Premier League

AFC Champions League

Group stage

Singapore Cup

See also 
 2012 Tampines Rovers FC season
 2013 Tampines Rovers FC season
 2014 Tampines Rovers FC season
 2015 Tampines Rovers FC season
 2016 Tampines Rovers FC season
 2017 Tampines Rovers FC season
 2018 Tampines Rovers FC season
 2019 Tampines Rovers FC season
 2020 Tampines Rovers FC season

Notes

References 

Tampines Rovers FC
Tampines Rovers FC seasons
2021 in Asian association football leagues